The Hirter beer is a brand of beer produced in Carinthia (a state of Austria) since 1270 AD. It is known to have a soft and slim predominant taste and a harmonic, bitter sweet aftertaste. Hirter beer has a long stocking time and is entirely natural without any pasteurization, hence it has an ABV of 8.3%.

References 

Beer brands
Economy of Carinthia (state)
Austrian brands